Wyola may refer to:

Inhabited localities
 Wyola, Arkansas, USA
 Wyola, Montana, USA
 Wyola, Pennsylvania, USA

Other
 Lake Wyola, Massachusetts, USA
 SS Wyola, Australian ship